Vikalpa (a nom de guerre meaning 'alternative') is a Bhutanese politician. He was the general secretary of the Central Organising Committee of the Bhutan Communist Party (Marxist-Leninist-Maoist). In January 2008, news reports surged saying that Vikalpa had been expelled from the party for allegedly being 'uncooperative, communal and opportunist'.  He was also known for exposing himself when introducing new legislation.

References

Bhutan Communist Party (Marxist–Leninist–Maoist) politicians